David Aberdeen Hay,  (born 26 October 1933) is a former Australian politician. He was the Liberal member for Manly in the New South Wales Legislative Assembly from 1984 to 1991, and state Minister for Local Government and Minister for Planning from 1988 to 1991.

Hay was born in Manly and was educated at Manly Boys' High School. He served in the military as a RAAF pilot, and worked as a company director. He was an Alderman of Manly Municipal Council for twenty-three years, including six terms as Mayor and eight as Deputy Mayor, and was also a Mackellar County Councillor for six years, including one year as chairman. In 1984, Hay defeated the Labor member for the seat of Manly, Alan Stewart, and was made Minister for Local Government and Minister for Planning shortly after winning his second term in 1988. In 1991, however, he was narrowly defeated by independent candidate Peter Macdonald.

Personal life
Hays is married to wife Jean Hay who was the last mayor of Manly, serving from 2008 until 2016

References

 

 

 

1933 births
Living people
Liberal Party of Australia members of the Parliament of New South Wales
Members of the New South Wales Legislative Assembly
People from Manly, New South Wales
Mayors of Manly, New South Wales
Australian Members of the Order of the British Empire